Klemens Andzrej Bąkiewicz de armis Topór  (1760 – 2 January 1842) was a bishop-elect of the Diocese of Sandomierz.

Bąkiewicz was born to Paul and Agnet Bąkiewicz in 1760; he would be baptized on 1 December at the church of Chmiel. Between 1786 and 1788, he served as professor of mathematics in the city of Kielce. Following the death of Adam Prosper Burzyński in 1830, Bąkiewicz would assume the role of apostolic administrator. Prior to Burzyński's death, he served as archdeacon.

Bąkiewicz was appointed as bishop on 9 January 1840; he would not be consecrated and was buried in Sandomierz Cathedral. Following his death, the tsar of Russia nominated three people to succeed him; these men were Józef Joachim Goldtmann, Thadée Kotowski and Antoine Lubienski. In a letter to Karl Nesselrode, dated 1 May 1843, Pope Gregory XVI refused to examine their bulls of institution. By 1844 - as a result of the tsar's impatience - Józef Goldtman was appointed as Bąkiewicz's successor.

References

Polish Roman Catholics

Catholic clergy
1760 births
1842 deaths